Scott Thomson (born October 29, 1957) is an American actor. He has appeared in the films Twister (1996), Ghoulies (1985), Fast Times at Ridgemont High (1982) and Police Academy (1984).

Early life
Thomson was born on October 29, 1957. He graduated from Lowell High School in Whittier, California in 1972.

Career
His film appearances include Parasite, Jack Frost, Clockstoppers, and It Runs in the Family.

Thomson played the role of Chad Copeland in the 1984 movie Police Academy (1984), a role in which he reprised in Police Academy 3: Back in Training (1986) and Police Academy 4: Citizens on Patrol (1987).

Filmography 

 The Greatest American Hero (1981) – Young Boy
 Jessica Novak (1981) – Richie
 Parasite (1982) – Chris
 Fast Times at Ridgemont High (1982) – Arnold
 T. J. Hooker (1982) – Deke
 Frightmare (1983) – Bobo
 Police Academy (1984) – Cadet Chad Copeland
 Ghoulies (1985) – Mike
 Johnny Dangerously (1984) – Charley
 Police Academy 3: Back in Training (1986) – Sgt. Chad Copeland
 Police Academy 4: Citizens on Patrol (1987) – Sgt. Chad Copeland
 The Couch Trip (1988) – Klevin
 Casual Sex? (1988) – Man #1
 Day One (1989) – Chemist
 Hunter (1989) – Danny McCann
 Star Trek: The Next Generation (1989) – Daimon Goss
 Parker Lewis Can't Lose (1990) – Mr. Kornstein
 Jack the Bear (1993) – Street Worker
 Mr. Jones (1993) – Conrad
 It Runs in the Family (1994) – Delbert Bumpus
 The Cosby Mysteries (1994) – Street Person
 Clueless (1995) – Flower Delivery Guy
 Twister (1996) – Jason "Preacher" Rowe
 Circles (1998) – Dick Halloran
 Jack Frost (1998) – Dennis Father
 Blast from the Past (1999) – Young Psycho
 Loser (2000) – Cell Phone Guy
 Clockstoppers (2002) – Tourist Dad
 Fawlty Tower Oxnard (2007) – The Major
 Big Love (2009) – Tour Guide
 Ghost Whisperer (2009) – Man
 True Blood (2010) – Mr. Rakestraw
 Night of the Living Dead 3D: Re-Animation (2012) – Werner Gottshok
 Vamps (2012) – Erik
 Keep It Together (2014) – Manager del hotel
 Greater (2015) – Dan Huber

External links 
 

1957 births
Living people
American male film actors
American male television actors